This article lists events that occurred during 1983 in Estonia.

Incumbents

Events
Adamson-Eric Museum was opened.

Births
1 June – Tõnis Sahk, long jumper

Deaths

See also
 1983 in Estonian television

References

 
1980s in Estonia
Estonia
Estonia
Years of the 20th century in Estonia